WSJT-LD, virtual channel 15 (VHF digital channel 10), is a low-powered television station licensed to Atlantic City, New Jersey, United States. The station is owned by Engle Broadcasting.

History 
The station's construction permit was issued on October 17, 2013, under the calls of WMGM-LD and changed to the current WSJT-LD.

Digital channels
The station's digital signal is multiplexed:

References

External links

Low-power television stations in the United States
SJT-LD
Television channels and stations established in 2013
2013 establishments in New Jersey
SJT-LD